You and I is a 1997 South Korean television series starring Choi Jin-sil, Park Sang-won, Cha In-pyo, Song Seung-heon, Choi Bool-am, Kim Hye-ja, Seo Yoo Jung, Kim Ji-young, and Lee Bon. It aired on MBC from 11 October 1997 to 26 April 1998 on Saturdays and Sundays at 20:00 for 58 episodes.

It is currently the highest-rated Korean drama of all time, based on single episode viewership ratings, reaching 66.9% on its final broadcast on 26 April 1998. Its average rating for its entire run was 43.7%.

Synopsis
Park Jae Chul (Choi Bool-am) is an old sailor and a father to three sons and one daughter, Park Dong Kyu (Park Sang-won), Park Young Gyu (Cha In-pyo), Sang Ok (Seo Yoo Jung), and Park Min Kyu (Song Seung-heon). Park Dong Kyu is working man and carrying the responsibility as the eldest in his family. He's in-love with Yoon Su Kyung (Choi Jin-sil). They work together to overcome all the difficulties to get married. Park Young Gyu dreams of nothing but money and marrying a rich girl on day. While serving in the military, he tricked a naive country girl Mi Sook (Kim Ji-young) whom he promised to marry.  Mi Sook becomes blinded by love and provided all his needs. Park Sang Ok is the only girl in the family. She's a college student. Their youngest Park Min Kyu is a quiet and introvert son. He distances himself from his family and people because he's troubled by the fact that he's from another mother. Though he's a talented painter, he doesn't use his talent much. His brother Park Young Gyu and the rich girl Shi Yeon (Lee Bon) always stand by his side and pushes him to be better.

Cast

Main
 Choi Jin-sil as Yoon Su Kyung
A woman with a cheerful and simple character who grew up loved and loved in an ordinary family. A female employee with a public loan at a mid-sized business want to get married and live well, and want to succeed in her field.
 Park Sang-won as Park Dong Kyu
An office worker with a patriarchal temperament and a little tacky. But essentially a romanticist. He has a lot of friends and juniors, and he is always busy because he has a wide range.

Supporting
 Cha In-pyo as Park Young Gyu
Park Dong Kyu's younger brother, whose only property is his handsome face. After an effort to pursue only a good daughter from a rich family, he almost achieves his dream, but he is caught steadily by the appearance of an ambush and becomes a street vendor in the market.
 Song Seung-heon as Park Min Kyu
Park Dong Kyu's youngest brother. Quiet problem. Almost no words are spoken enough to be suspicious of dumb, but once an accident occurs, the scale is different from that of an accident that Yeong-gyu does. He looks at the world grimly because of the complex called revitalization of the housekeeper who helped work in the house.
 Choi Bool-am as Park Jae Chul
Park Dong Kyu's father. The former Madoros. Currently, he is a sea fishing guide. As the nickname (Peng Peng) suggests, a man who is unlikely to grow old forever even when he is older. Currently widower.
 Kim Hye-ja as Kim Eun Soon
Yoon Su Kyung's pro-hering mother, devoted to her children. She gives all his fortune to his sons and is in a hellish situation. She regrets raising her child incorrectly late, but the only thing left for her is mild symptoms of dementia due to shock.
 Seo Yoo-jung as Park Sang Ok
Park Dong Kyu's younger sister. An aspiring narrator model who is immature and has a lot of vanity. She meets a dangerous man, suffers a broken heart, and ends up on the verge of suicide, but leads a new life.
 Kim Ji-young as Mi Sook
An honest and stubborn girl from a rural village. While in the army, he met Park Young Gyu and made love, but after being abandoned by Park Young Gyu, she gave birth to his baby alone and lived a steadfast business by selling herbs.
 Lee Bon as Shi Yeon
A rich daughter was looking by Park Young Gyu. However, due to complicated family circumstances, she runs away from the house, connects with Park Young Gyu and gets to know Park Min Kyu.

Viewership 
 In this table,  represent the lowest ratings and  represent the highest ratings.

References

External links
  
 

MBC TV television dramas
1997 South Korean television series debuts
1998 South Korean television series endings
Korean-language television shows